William John Landers (26 April 1901 – 22 December 1958) was an Irish Gaelic footballer who played at club level with Rock Street and at inter-county level with the Kerry senior football team. He usually lined out as a forward.

Career

Landers enjoyed a successful Gaelic football career and was part of two All-Ireland-winning teams. He was also on the losing side in the 1923 All-Ireland final. Landers's inter-county career was interrupted as a result of his emigration to the United States in 1925. He returned in 1932 and immediately regained his place on the Kerry team, while he also won a County Championship title with Rock Street. Landers captained the Kerry team that toured North America in 1933 and played his last game for the team in an All-Ireland semi-final defeat by Cavan that same year. He also earned selection on the Munster team.

Personal life and death

Landers was one of three brothers, with Tim (Roundy) and John Joe (Purty), who between them won 12 All-Ireland medals. He was involved in the War of Independence and took the anti-Treaty side during the Civil War.

Landers died from a heart attack on 22 December 1958.

Honours

Rock Street
Kerry Senior Football Championship: 1932

Kerry
All-Ireland Senior Football Championship: 1924, 1932
Munster Senior Football Championship: 1923, 1924, 1932, 1933
National Football League: 1931–32

References

1901 births
1958 deaths
Austin Stacks Gaelic footballers
Kerry inter-county Gaelic footballers
Munster inter-provincial Gaelic footballers
Winners of two All-Ireland medals (Gaelic football)